Eduard Jäger von Jaxtthal (25 June 1818, Vienna – 5 July 1884, Vienna) was an Austrian ophthalmologist who was a native of Vienna. He was a professor at the University of Vienna, and was son to oculist Friedrich Jäger von Jaxtthal (1784-1871), and grandson to Georg Joseph Beer (1763-1821).

Jäger is remembered for his work involving eye operations, and for his research of ophthalmic disorders. He was an early practitioner of the ophthalmoscope, and was among the first to use ophthalmoscopy to determine refractive error in the eye. Also, he is credited with providing the first description of retinal appearances associated with diabetes.

In the 1850s Jäger made improvements to eye chart test types that were earlier developed by Heinrich Küchler (1811-1873). In 1862 Dutch ophthalmologist Hermann Snellen introduced the popular "Snellen chart" for testing visual acuity.

Selected writings 
 Beiträge zur Pathologie des Auges (Contributions to the pathology of the eye); Wien: Staatsdruckerei, 1855.
 Ergebnisse der Untersuchung des menschlichen Auges mit dem Augenspiegel (Results of the investigation of the human eye with the ophthalmoscope); Wien: Staatsdr. 1855.
 Ophthalmoskopischer Hand-Atlas (Ophthalmoscopic hand atlas); Wien, Hofdruckerei 1869.

References

External links 
 Biographical information @ Aeiou Encyclopedia
 The Bernard Becker Collection in Ophthalmology

See also 
Jäger (disambiguation)

Austrian ophthalmologists
Academic staff of the University of Vienna
Austrian untitled nobility
Physicians from Vienna
1884 deaths
1818 births